Kwun Tong is an area in the Kwun Tong District of Hong Kong, situated at the eastern part of the Kowloon Peninsula, and its boundary stretches from Lion Rock in the north to Lei Yue Mun in the south, and from the winding paths of Kowloon Peak in the east to the north coast of the former Kai Tak Airport runway in the west.

One of the first New towns in Hong Kong, Kwun Tong was, and remains, a major industrial area. Its population has been growing rapidly, and the demand for housing, medical and educational facilities and services has been increasing. In view of this, a number of community development projects, such as the redevelopment of old housing estates and the construction of major parks, have been implemented in recent years. These projects have incorporated a wide range of supporting facilities, like primary and secondary schools, clinics, community centres and open spaces. All these facilities have brought about a new face to the Kwun Tong District, making it a more comfortable place for the people to live.

History

The Chinese name of Kwun Tong ("") was formerly written as "" (transcribed as Koon Tong in Cantonese Yale). Despite the identical pronunciation of these two names in Cantonese, they have different meanings. "" literally means Mandarin Pond, which was allegedly named after the Koon Fu salt yards set up by the government to secure central administration of the salt trade and prevent unauthorised salt preparation and trading starting from Song Dynasty. In those days, there were many salt yards around Kwun Tong, whose long coastline stretched to as far as Kowloon Bay and To Kwa Wan in the west. Troops were stationed here to monitor the salt yards' operation. Despite the government's close watch, illegal salt trade was still active on Lantau Island. When it was discovered by the officials, a full-scale crackdown was initiated. The Lantau villagers instigated an all-out uprising of salt farmers, leading finally to a major civil riot.

According to other stories, Kwun Tong was a typhoon shelter for the Kowloon Water Police, which made it an important political and defence point of north-west Kowloon. Black Hill (Ng Kwai Shan), which today rises up behind Lam Tin Estate, was known as Koon Fu Hill at that time.

In the 1950s, when Kwun Tong was being developed as a satellite town, the local residents disliked the word Koon, which literally means official or government, and they persuaded the Hong Kong government to change the place name to Kwun Tong, which literally means viewing a pond. The development of Kwun Tong spearheaded the construction and planning of new towns in the New Territories, although the first project was limited in scope and did not share the features of self-contained communities like the later ones.

Features

Town centre
 Yue Man Square is the heart of the town. Most of the banks' branches are located on this road. The Government District Office is located at the eastern end of Yue Man Square. More than 20 franchised bus and public mini-bus routes pass through or stop at this road. Yue Man Square is presently being demolished and replaced by a shopping centre by the Urban Renewal Authority.
 Mut Wah Street is also called "Golden Street" because there were nearly 10 jewelry shops. It is most famous for the armed-robbery by Yip Kai-Fuen when he used an AK-47 assault rifle to rob 5 of the jewelry shops in 1992.
 Shui Wo Street is a market street. It is also home to the Shui Wo Street Complex, which houses an indoor market, a public library, and a sports hall. 
 Hip Wo Street has the one and only hospital in Kwun Tong, namely United Christian Hospital, at 130 Hip Wo Street.
 Hong Ning Road is the "Mid-levels" of Kwun Tong. The headquarters of Hong Kong Police Force Sau Mau Ping Division is at 200 Hong Ning Road, near Sau Mau Ping. It is also home to Hong Ning Road Park, one of the largest parks in the area.
 Tsui Ping Road is located in Kwun Tong. Tsui Ping Estate. Kwun Tong Maryknoll College is located at 100 Tsui Ping Road.
 Yuet Wah Street is located in Kwun Tong. Wo Lok Estate is situated here.
 Kwun Tong Road is the main road that leads into and out of the Kwun Tong district. Kwun Tong MTR station is directly above this road. Kwun Tong's latest shopping mall, apm, is situated on this road next to Kwun Tong MTR station.
apm Millennium City 5 is one of the largest shopping centres in East Kowloon, with its slogan "Play More Sleep Less".

Industrial area

Kwun Tong was one of the minor residential areas in Hong Kong, with factories having been built there since the 1950s. The industrial area has since then expanded to Kowloon Bay and Yau Tong. Since the manufacturing sector of Hong Kong is in decline, many factories have been torn down and commercial buildings are being constructed to replace them.

In recent years, the government has started to re-develop the coastal area of Kwun Tong to correspond with the re-development of the Kai Tak district. A promenade and a park has been built along the coast near Kwun Tong Pier.

Residential area
The residential areas in Kwun Tong are mainly located in lower Kwun Tong, to the northeast of Kwun Tong Road.

Locations
Kwun Tong is situated at the eastern part of the Kowloon Peninsula, and its boundary stretches from Lion Rock in the north to Lei Yue Mun in the south, and from the winding paths of Kowloon Peak in the east to the north coast of the Airport (Kai Tak) runway in the west.

Economy
Gammon Construction has its head office in Kwun Tong. It occupies  of space there. It moved from Quarry Bay circa 2019.

Transport
Kwun Tong is served by the Kwun Tong station of MTR's Kwun Tong line.

Roads that are serving the area include:

 Kwun Tong Road
 Tate's Cairn Tunnel
 Kwun Tong Bypass
 Eastern Harbour Crossing
 Tseung Kwan O Tunnel

Kwun Tong Pier used to be a major transport hub for cross-harbour passengers until the opening of the MTR and the Eastern Harbour Crossing. Today, ferry services to Sai Wan Ho and North Point are still available.

KMB bus terminus serving the area include:

 Elegance Road Bus Terminus: 13M, 95M
 Yue Man Square Bus Terminus: 3D, 16M, 17, 101, 101R, 101X, N3D
 Kwun Tong Ferry Pier Bus Terminus: 11D, 23, 40P, 55, 69C, 74B, 74C, 74D, 74E, 74F, 74P, 74X, 80, 80A, 80P, 80X, 83A, 83X, 93A, 258X, 259S, 268A, 268C, 269C, 269S, 274X, T74, X89D
 Tsui Ping Road Bus Terminus: 11B, 89C, 89X
 Kwun Tong Station Bus Terminus: 16M, 89, 89B, 98B, 234C, 234D

Following some recent redevelopment plans in Kwun Tong, the Yuet Wah Street Bus Terminus is about to be demolished, and the routes originally terminating there will be moved to the New Kwun Tong Station Bus Terminus and Yue Man Square Bus Terminus.

Located near the area is the former Kai Tak Airport, which is currently the site of a large cruise terminal, opened in 2013.

See also

 Public housing estates in Kwun Tong
 List of areas of Hong Kong
 Old Industrial Buildings Revitalization in Hong Kong

References

External links

 Kwun Tong District Council
 District Council Election 2007 - Electoral Boundary Maps - Kwun Tong
 Kwun Tong District Council - Fun in Kwun Tong

 
New Kowloon
New towns started in the 1950s
New towns in Hong Kong